School District 15 may refer to:
Community Consolidated School District 15
Marquardt School District 15
Meridian Community Unit School District 15
Tuba City Unified School District (TCUSD #15)